Ancient Mithila University was an Indian historical university famous for Nyaya Shastra and logical sciences.

Background

Gurukuls of the Vedic period in India can be called the ancient form of university because they had a system of higher education.  Later, in the Upanishads and the Brahmanical period, we find the "Council" functioning as a university.  These councils held conferences of scholarly teachers and students and were authorized to confer degrees. The Ancient Mithila University was gradually started from the philosophical conferences held by Janaka, the king of Mithila at his court. There was a council of philosophical Conferences in the Mithila know as Mithila Darshanik Sammelan Parishad. The council was founded by the King Janaka at his court. The council was holding philosophical conferences at the court of the King Janaka. These philosophical conferences led to the formation of a seat of learning and this seat of learning converted into the university of Mithila. It was the prominent seat of Brahmanical system of education.

Mithila is the seat of Maithil Brahmin. From ancient times, Maithil Brahmins had given different dimensions to the ancient Indian Philosophy. Nyaya Shastra, Tarka Shastra, Mimansa and Shankhya Shastra were mostly emerged from Mithila. Uddalaka Aruni discovered the theory of three elements of the life. Ashtavakra taught King Janaka the metaphysical nature of existence and the meaning of individual freedom. The philosophical conversation between Ashtavakra and Janaka is recorded as ancient philosophical texts known as Ashtavakra Gita or Ashtavakra Samhita.  Similarly Yajnavalkya taught Brahman Vidya to the King Janaka.

Yajnavalkya is the author of Satapatha Brahman and is considered as the Father of Indian philosophy. Gargi Vachaknavi was a Brahmavadini. She composed several hymns in the Rig Veda that questioned the origin of all existence. She was honoured as one of the Navaratnas (nine gems) in the court of King Janaka of Mithila. She took part in the Shastrarth with Yajnavalkya, in which she asked some questions related to the foundation of the existence of the nature. Yajnavalkya answered all her questions.

Maitreyi was another Brahmavadini who lived during the later Vedic period in ancient India. She is mentioned in the Brihadaranyaka Upanishad as one of two wives of the Vedic sage Yajnavalkya. She was Advaita philosopher. In the Rigveda about ten hymns are attributed to Maitreyi. She explores the Hindu concept of Atman (soul or self) in a dialogue contained in the Brihadaranyaka Upanishad. The dialogue, also called the Maitreyi-Yajnavalkya dialogue, states that love is driven by a person's soul, and it discusses the nature of Atman and Brahman and their unity, the core of Advaita philosophy. She is estimated to have lived around the 8th century BCE. Aksapada Gautama founded Nyaya Shastra. Mandana Mishra (8th century CE) was a Hindu philosopher who wrote on the Mīmāṁsā and Advaita systems of thought. He was a follower of the Karma Mimamsa school of philosophy and a staunch defender of the holistic sphota doctrine of language. He was a contemporary of Adi Shankara. Maṇḍana Miśra is known to be a student of a mimamsa scholar Kumarila Bhatta, but who also wrote a work on Advaita, the Brahma-siddhi. He is best known as the author of the Brahmasiddhi. In the 9th to 10th century, Vācaspati Miśra was philosopher of Advaita Vedanta and wrote one non-commentary, Tattvabindu, or Drop of Truth, which focuses on Mīmāṃsā theories of sentence meaning. In the 14th century, Vidyapati emerged as Maithili and Sanskrit poet, composer, writer, courtier and royal priest in Mithila. He was a devotee of Shiva, but also wrote love songs and devotional Vaishnava songs. He knew Sanskrit, Prakrit, Apabhramsha, and Maithili.

History 

This university was very famous for its Nyaya Shastra. Nyaya Shastra was founded by Aksapada Gautama. It was later developed by Gangeśa Upadhyay. From 12th century to 15th century, it was important center for learning and cultures. In Kamesvara period Jagaddhara was a scholar, who wrote commentaries on a variety of subjects, such as the Gita, Devimahatmya, Meghaduta, Gita Govinda and Malati Madhava and others as well as wrote original treatises on erotics such as Rasika Sarvasva, Sangita Sarvasva. Similarly Sankara Misra was another scholar who worked on the Vaisheshika, the Nyaya and the Smrti. Vasudeva Sarvabhauma, the famous logician of Nadia, received his education at Mithila in the 15th century. In the 15th century, Raghunath Siromani, was the head of the university. At that time this university was also known as Mithila Vidyapeeth. According to the scholars and historians of Maharajadhiraja Lakshmishwar Singh Museum and Maithili Sahitya Sansthan, the university of Nalanda and Vikramshila were destroyed by Mughal Emperors because these universities were organised at particular places. But to destroy  the university of ancient Mithila was not so easy because it was spread out in many Ashram or Gurukul of the different ancient  philosophers or sages of Mithila. So this university remained till the 20th century. According to Abul Fazal during the reign of Shah Jahan, Mithila became famous for its scholars and poets who received rewards from the Emperor for their scholarship. In the 16th century, Mithila emerged as the chief centre of both secular and religious learning. Sanskrit scholars from different parts of India came to Mithila to study Hindu Philosophy. In Mughal period, Raghunandan Dasa was an eminent intellectual of the university. Mughal Emperor Akbar was very influenced by him, so he gifted him the entire Mithila as a gift. But Raghunandan Dasa later offered it to his Guru Mahesh Thakur as Guru Dakshina. Mahesh Thakur established Darbhanga Raj Kingdom on the day of Ram Navami in 1557 AD.

Examination System 

The name of the examination of this university was known as 'Salaka Pariksha'. It was examined by Dvara-Panditas (who were considered the most learned and revered of the scholars at that time) . In this examination candidate have to explain the portion of the page in a manuscript which is pierced by a needle. This examination was for candidates to complete graduation certificate. There was more tough level of examination than Salaka Pariksha in which candidate is required to present himself in the examination by the public. This latter examination was known as ‘Sadayantra’. The scholar or candidate in this examination could be asked to any question on any topic by the people they liked. After passing this Sadayantra test, scholars were honoured by three different classifications Upadhaya, Mahopadhaya and Mahamahopadhaya according to the level of knowledge. These honours were much coveted among the scholars. In the period of Darbhanga Raj Kingdom or Khandwala Dynasty, the examination system was known as Dhout - Pariksha. The examinations were organised at the court of the Kingdom. After successful in the examination, the candidates were imparted a pair of Dhoti as honours by the King ( Maharaja ) of the Kingdom. According to historian Pankaj Kumar Jha, there are evidences of only five occasions when the examinations were held. The first examination was held during Maharaja Mahesh Thakur; second in the time of Maharaja Maheshwar Singh; third in the reign of Maharaja Lakshmishwar Singh; the fourth one during the period of Maharajadhiraja Rameshwar Singh; and the last one was held during the reign of Maharajadhiraja Kameshwar Singh. The examination acquired immense credibility, so much so that "whenever invitation was to be extended to Pundits by the Maharaja or the wealthy persons of Mithila preference was given to the 'Dhautparikshottirna'. Dhautparikshottirna means passed in the examination of "Dhoti."

Education system and Curriculum 
The educational system of Mithila University was very strict. According to historian John Keay, no one was allowed to copy the Texts of the university to outside the university. One has to only remember the texts. The minimum period of studentship of this university was twelve years. After that student continue postgraduate studies and teaching. The ideal qualities of the students of the university were qualities of calmness ( santa ), self-restraint ( danta ), self-denial ( uparata ) and patience ( titiksha ).

Scholars and teachers of Mithila 

In Mithila there were a lots of scholars and teachers who flourished educational system in the Kingdom. Following are some of the list of them.
 Maharshi Panchashikha preached  Samkhya Shastra to Dharmadhvaj Janaka, the King of Mithila. He wrote Shashti Tantra. This book is 60 chapters of the Samkhya Shastra. He wrote 60000 verses on the nature of Matters (Prakriti), the self, the faculties of perception and action and supra normal powers. He taught about the relation between the body and the soul in the earthly life and after death.
 Kapila is the author of the ancient Indian philosophy of Shankhya Shastra.  His ashram was at Kapileshwar Sthan in the Mithila region of Madhubani district in Bihar. He wrote his Shankhya Shastra philosophy and taught his disciples there.

 Shukhdev, the son of the sage Vyasa came Mithila to study higher spiritual knowledge from the King Janaka. In Sugga village near Jaleshwar, there is Ashram of Shukhdeva.

 Ayachi Mishra ( Bhavnath Mishra ) was a scholar of Nyaya Shastra. He taught his disciples in free of cost. On the behalf of Guru dakshina, he asked his disciples  to teach 10 people. He also taught his son Shankar Mishra. Shankar Mishra wrote 19 book on the basis of his far teaching.
 Paksadhara Misra was the teacher of the famous scholars Vasudeva Sarvabhauma and Raghunatha Siromani. In his academy, no one was allowed to copy the lectures provided by him to his disciples in written format. He is the author of Aloka ( आलोक ) which is a commentary on Tattvachintamani. He was one of the founders of Navya Nyaya Shastra ( New Logic ) of the ancient Indian philosophy. His academy is also known as Paksadhara Mithila School.
 Udayana, (Devanagari: उदयन) also known as Udayanācārya (Udyanacharya, or Master Udayana), (circa 975 - 1050 CE) was an Indian philosopher and logician of the tenth century of the Nyaya school who attempted to devise a rational theology to prove the existence of God using logic and counter the attack on the existence of God at the hands of Buddhist philosophers such as Dharmakīrti, Jñānaśrī and against the Indian school of materialism (Chārvaka). He lived in Kariyan village in Mithila, near present-day Darbhanga, Bihar state, India. Udayana wrote a sub-gloss on Vachaspati Misra's work called the Nyaya-vaartika-taatparya-tiikaa-parishuddhi.  He wrote several other works such as the Kusumanjali, Atma-tattva-viveka, Kiranaavali and Nyaya-parishishhta (also called Bodha siddhi or Bodha shuddhi).
 Vidyapati was the most notable poet of Maithili language. He wrote many books in Maithili language. He was also a renowned scholars of Sanskrit. He taught students in the Ancient Mithila University and added luster to the glorious achievement of the university. His major works were Kirtilata, Kirtipalaka, Bhuparikrama, Purushapariksha, Likhanavali. Saivasarvasvasara, Gangavakyavali, Vibhagasara, Durgabhaktitarangini, Varshakritya, Gayapatalaka, Manimanjari, Gorakshavijaya, Danavakyavali, Vyadhibhaktitarangini and many more.

List of teachers of Nyaya Shastra in Mithila 
The list of teachers of Nyaya (including Navya-Nyāya), one of the six astika Indian Philosophy in Mithila

 Akṣapāda Gautama
 Pakṣilasvāmin Vātsyāyana
 Udyotakara
 Jayanta Bhatta
 Vācaspati Miśra
 Bhāsavarajña
 Udayana
 Gangeśa Upādhyāya
 Vardhamāna Upādhyāya
 Pakṣadhara Miśra
 Vāsudeva Sārvabhauma
 Padmanābha Miśra
 Raghunātha Śiromaṇi

Astrology and Astronomy in Mithila 

There were many astronomers and astrologers who flourished astronomy and astrology in the ancient Mithila. Varunci composed Bhargavamuhurta in the 11th century. In the 13th century, Harinatha wrote Sanketakakaumudi while is work on Phalita-Jyotisa. He is also the author of Smritisara. Similarly Dhiresvara wrote Buddhipradipa which deals with the calculation of the auspicious day and night. In the 14th century, Jivesvara ( son of Dhiresvara ) wrote Ratnasataka which is a muhurtagrantha. Haradatta ( son of Devaditya ) wrote Daivajnabandhava and Gatinamamala. Candesvara ( son of Viresvara ) wrote on Jyotisa known as Krtyacintamani.
In 15th century, Ganapati Thakur father of Vidyapati wrote two works on Jyotisa known as Bhumibrahamana and Gangabhaktitarangni. Vidyapati wrote Jyotisadarpana. MM Paksadhara ( son of MM Vatesvara ) was the colleague of Vidyapati wrote two works on Jyotisa known as Subhodh and Tithicandrika.
Haripati ( son of Vidyapati ) wrote Vyavaharapradipika which is preserved in Kameshwar Singh Darbhanga Sanskrit University and Mithila Research Institute at Darbhanga. Narahari wrote Svarodayatika and Ahibalacakra on Jyotisa. Madhusudana wrote Jyotisapradipankura which is preserved in India Office Library, London. Laksmidasa Misra ( son of Vachaspati Misra ) wrote an exposition on Siddhantasiromani known as Ganitatattavacintamani. It consists of 7500 verses. Vibhakara wrote Prasanakaumudi who was also a Justice in the court of King Ramabhadra Simha. In the same time, Parama Misra wrote Mukundavijaya. Nanhidatta wrote Balabodhini which was a booklet for beginners. MM Srinivasa wrote Suddhidipika. MM Mahesha Thakur, the founder of Raj Darbhanga wrote Aticaradinirnaya.

Political Sciences in Mithila 
Chandeshvara Thakur wrote Rajnītiratnākāra in the second half of the thirteen century under the patronage of the Karnata king. He was the most renowned political thinker of Mithila. Rajnītiratnākāra is the oldest work on the subject of state affairs and politics in Mithila. Similarly Jyotishwara Thakur wrote Varnā-Ratnākāra. He had given detailed description about eighty four types of kingly qualities and use of thirty six kinds of weapons in which a competent king must be skilled. He has given a long list of administrative officers and also vividly describes the court life and its decorum. Misaru Mishra wrote Vīvādachandra. Vidyapati wrote Bībhāgasāra. In Bībhāgasāra, Vidyapati strongly supports monarchy and he believes that the king is the main source of all law. Similarly Vardhamana wrote Dandavīveka and Vacaspati Mishra wrote Vyāvāharāchīntāmani. These are well-marked works on the law, administrative matters and justice as such they are important for the study of contemporary polity.

Location 

According to some scholars, the capital city of the ancient kingdom of Mithila was at Balirajgarh in Madhubani district of the present Bihar state in India. But according to the believes of the most common people, the present city of Janakpur in Nepal is considered as the ancient capital city of Mithila kingdom. The headquarter of the Ancient Mithila University was at the court of King Janaka in Mithila. Therefore there are two possible sites of the headquarter of the Ancient Mithila University.

Libraries of Mithila 
According to historians, ancient Mithila was the seat of knowledge and education. They also called it as Saraswati Vidyapeeth. Every village of the ancient Mithila had a library in its Gurukul. In those libraries hand written books were kept. These books were written by the Brahmins of the villages. Those days it was fundamental work of the Brahmins to write books and taught it to their disciples. These books were used by the students there for recitation their educational lessons.

Related places and Ashrams 
The University of Ancient Mithila was spread in different ashrams of the sages and the philosophers in Mithila. Below are the lists of the places related to the Ashrams.

Yajnavalkya Ashram was a gurukul of the Indian philosopher Yajnavalkya in Mithila. It is situated at Jagban village of Madhubani district in Mithila region of Bihar.

Gautam Ashram was a gurukul of the ancient Indian philosopher Gautama. It is located at the west bank of Khiroi river in Brahmpur village of Jale block of Darbhanga district in Bihar.

Kapil Ashram was a Hindu monastery of the Vedic sage Kapila. He is the author of Shankhya Shastra of Ancient Indian philosophy. It is located at Kakraul village of Rahika block in Madhubani district of Mithila region of Bihar.

Banauli Vidyapati Dih is a historical place related to the great Maithili poet Vidyapati. It is located at Banauli village of Mahottari district in Madhesh Pradesh of Mithila region in Nepal. Students from different parts of Mithila came here to study from Vidyapati.

Shukhdeva Ashram was the ashram of the sage Shukhdeva at Sugga village of Mahottari district near Jaleshwar Municipality in Nepal.

Kalidas Dih is a historical and holy place located approximately in Uchchaith Sthan village in Madhubani district of Bihar, India. It is associated with the Sanskrit scholar, playwright and dramatist Kalidasa. In this village, there is a mud mound known as Kalidas Dih. There are statues of Kalidasa and his works. It is believed that Kalidasa wrote most of his books here. It is one of the memorial monument of Kalidasa.

Bhattpur was a village in Mithila related Mimansa scholar Kumarila Bhatt. There was an academy of Kumarila Bhatt, where he taught Mimansa Philosophy to his student Mandan Mishra.

Bharati-Mandan Mishra Dham, Mahishi is the Ashram of the Mimansa scholar Mandan Mishra. It is the place where shastrarth between Mandan Mishra and Adi Shankaracharya took place. In the shastrarth Adi Shankaracharya defeated Mandan Mishra but after that the wife of Mandan Mishra known as Bharati also defeated Adi Shankaracharya asking the questions on the Kamashastra.

Birth of Nabadwip University 
Gangesa Upadhyay of Mithila and Raghunatha Shiromani of Nabadwip developed a new version of Nyaya Shastra known as Navya Nyaya School of Indian Philosophy to combat with the logic of Buddhism Philosophy and to defeat them to minimise Buddhism influence. They established a new university for Hindu philosophy at Nabadwip (Nadia district)  known as Nabadwip University or Nadia University. Vasudeva Sarvabhauma was once prevented from copying the texts of Mithila University, then he committed to memorize the whole parts of Tattav Chintamani and the metrical part of Kusumanjali. He then wrote down the texts at Nadia, which he memorized and helped in establishment of the new university at Nadia. Mahamahopadhyaya Gokulnath (1650-1750) was the scholar of Mithila migrated to Nadia to contribute in the establishment of new school of logic known as ‘Navya Nyaya’. This led to the decline of the reputation and importance of Mithila. From here Nadia emerged as second center of learning of Hindu Philosophy.

References 

Ancient universities of the Indian subcontinent
Ancient universities
Philosophers of Mithila
Ancient Indian literature
Ancient Indian culture
Hindu educational institutions